Events from the year 1601 in Ireland.

Incumbent
Monarch: Elizabeth I

Events
January – Nine Years' War: John Óge Burke is captured, and later executed.
October 2 – Siege of Kinsale begins.
November 30 – Prince Hugh Roe O'Donnell, on his way to the Battle of Kinsale, visits and venerates a relic of the True Cross (Holy rood) on the Feast of St. Andrew, at Holy Cross Abbey.
Moyry Castle built.

Births

Deaths
April – Emon O'Reilly, King of East Breifne
June – John Óge Burke, rebel soldier.
November – James FitzGerald, 1st Earl of Desmond, exiled noble (b. c.1570)
Ulick Burke, 3rd Earl of Clanricarde, noble.
John Chardon, Church of Ireland Bishop of Down and Connor.

References

 
1600s in Ireland
Ireland
Years of the 17th century in Ireland